One Voice is the debut studio album by American country music singer Billy Gilman. The album was released on June 20, 2000, by Epic Records Nashville. It reached number two on the Billboard Top Country Albums chart, and was certified 2× Platinum by RIAA. The highest-charting single from the album was its title track, which reached 20 on Hot Country Songs and 38 on the Billboard Hot 100. It made Gilman the youngest male artist in history (at 12 years old) to have a solo top 40 hit on the country charts.

Track listing

Personnel
Credits for One Voice adapted from the album's liner notes.
Vocals
Billy Gilman – lead vocals
Wes Hightower – background vocals
Liana Manis – background vocals
Anthony Martin – background vocals
Jimmy Nichols – background vocals
Cindy Richardson-Walker – background vocals
Lisa Silver – background vocals

Instruments
Mark Casstevens – gut string guitar, acoustic guitar
Eric Darken – percussion
Larry Franklin – fiddle, mandolin
Carl Gorodetzky – string contractor
Jim Horn – horn arrangements, tenor saxophone
John Barlow Jarvis – keyboards
Blair Masters – drum loops
Jerry McPherson – gut string guitar, acoustic guitar
Greg Morrow – drums
The Nashville String Machine – strings
Jimmy Nichols – keyboards
Steve Patrick – trumpet
Michael Rhodes – bass guitar
Tom Roady – percussion
Charles Rose – trombone
Brent Rowan – electric guitar
Harvey Thompson – tenor saxophone
Robby Turner – steel guitar
Bergen White – string arrangements

Technical
Mike Bradley – recording engineer
Mark Capps – assistant engineering
Derek Bason – additional engineering, vocal editing
Tony Castle – additional engineering, vocal editing
Graham Lewis – additional engineering
Billy Sherrill – additional engineering
Julian King – mixing
George Massenburg – mixing
Rich Hanson – assistant mixing
Jenny Rosato – assistant mixing
Denny Purcell – mastering
Eric Conn – digital editing
Carlos Grier – digital editing

Imagery
Tracy Baskette – art direction
Bill Johnson – art direction
Eddie Malluk – cover photo
Mary Beth Felts – hair/make-up
Rudy Sotomayor – hair/make-up
Marina Chavez – photography
Renee Fowler – stylist
Richie Owings – stylist

Charts

Weekly charts

Year end charts

Certifications and sales

References

2000 debut albums
Epic Records albums
Billy Gilman albums
Albums produced by Don Cook
Albums produced by Blake Chancey
Albums produced by David Malloy